Robert Fuller (born Leonard Leroy Lee, July 29, 1933) is an American horse rancher and retired actor. He began his career on television, guest-starring primarily on Western programs, while appearing in several movies, including: The Brain from Planet Arous; Teenage Thunder (both in 1957); Return of the Seven (1966); Incident at Phantom Hill (1969); and The Hard Ride (1971).
In his five decades of television, Fuller was known for his deep, raspy voice and was familiar to television viewers throughout the 1960s from his co-star roles on the popular 1960s Western series, as Jess Harper, former gunslinger, on Laramie and Cooper Smith on Wagon Train, and was also well known for his starring role as Dr. Kelly Brackett in the 1970s medical/action drama Emergency!

Early life
Fuller was born as Leonard Leroy Lee on July 29, 1933, in Troy, New York, the only child of Elizabeth Lee, a dance instructor. Before his birth, Betty married Robert Simpson Sr., a Naval Academy officer. In 1939, at the age of 6, he and his family moved to Key West, Florida, where, already known by the nickname of "Buddy," he took the name Robert Simpson Jr. The early highlights of his life were acting and dancing. His parents owned a dancing school in Florida. His family also moved to Chicago, Illinois, where they lived for one year, before moving back to Florida. Simpson Jr., as he was then still formally known, attended the Miami Military School for fifth and sixth grade, and Key West High School for ninth grade. He dropped out in 1948, at the age of 14, due to the fact that he disliked school and was doing poorly there. In 1950, at the age of 16, he traveled with his family to Hollywood, California, where his first job was as a stunt man. He also worked at Grauman's Chinese Theatre, beginning as a doorman and working his way up to Assistant Manager by age 18. At the urging of friends, Simpson Jr. joined the Screen Actors Guild, embarked on a career in acting, and changed his name from Robert Simpson Jr. to Robert Fuller, the name by which he was known at his most prominent.

Career

Early career
Fuller's first small role was as an extra in the 1952 film Above and Beyond. This part led to much extra work on many projects, one of which was in I Love Melvin. In 1953, he again had another minor part in Gentlemen Prefer Blondes, which starred Marilyn Monroe and the Doris Day classic, Calamity Jane. Fuller's career then went on hold for service in the United States Army. He served a tour of duty in Korea and returned to the United States in 1955. Though he had been considering giving up acting, Fuller, at the suggestion of his best friend, Chuck Courtney, attended Richard Boone's acting classes. Boone suggested that Fuller study under the tutelage of Sanford Meisner at New York City's Neighborhood Playhouse. Fuller's first speaking role was in Friendly Persuasion in 1956, where he worked with his future Laramie co-star John Smith and another close friend, Doug McClure.

In the 1956 episode "The Comeback" in the religion anthology series, Crossroads, Fuller played the part of a former soldier. In the story line, Don DeFore, as the Reverend C. E. "Stoney" Jackson, offers spiritual insight to assist Lou Brissie (Chuck Connors) who is recovering from wounds sustained in World War II to enable him to return to professional baseball. Grant Withers appeared as Coach Whitey Martin and Crossroads regular Robert Carson appeared as a coach.

In 1957, Fuller was cast in his first major film role in Teenage Thunder. He said of it:

{{blockquote|I always wanted to be in show business and with the help of my best buddy, Chuck Courtney, who was an actor then, he helped get me my first starring role in a movie called Teenage Thunder. It was a break for me and since Chuck had the pull at the time to get the director, Paul Helmick, use me for the bad guy and not another actor that he really wanted. It was the gateway to many other roles which led to the Laramie series and so on and so forth.|author=Robert Fuller, emergencyfans.com}}

Also in 1957, Fuller starred in the science fiction film The Brain from Planet Arous.Television work in the late 1950s and 1960s
Fuller became an immensely popular character actor, guest-starring in dozens of television programs including Buckskin, The Big Valley, Official Detective, The Californians, The Restless Gun, The Lawless Years (as Cutie Jaffe on May 7, 1959), U.S. Marshal, Panic!,  M Squad, The Adventures of Rin Tin Tin, "The Monroes" and the Lux Playhouse. He also appeared in the series Strange Intruder as a villain who dies in the third episode. In 1959, he portrayed a character accused of arson in Broderick Crawford's syndicated series, Highway Patrol. He also made appearances in ABC's The Life and Legend of Wyatt Earp and Mickey Spillane's syndicated Mike Hammer. 
  He played Alex in a 1958 episode of Death Valley Days, "The Gunsmith", in support of guest star Anthony Caruso, and returned to the show in 1959 to play clever Mexican-American cattle rustler Johnny Santos in the episode, "Ten In Texas".

On February 24, 1959, Fuller guest-starred in the episode "Blind Is the Killer," in NBC's Cimarron City television series. This appearance propelled him into a lead role seven months later in Laramie, one of the comparatively few network programs set in Wyoming. Fuller appeared as Joe Cole, a young gunfighter seeking a reputation, who found his target in Cimarron City Mayor Matt Rockford, played by George Montgomery. Cole temporarily blinded Rockford with glass from a broken whisky bottle. The two were ultimately reconciled after each had a chance to prove his courage. John Smith, Fuller's co-star on Laramie, was a regular in Cimarron City, and the two appeared together briefly in this episode, which also featured Dennis McCarthy as Dr. "Doc" Hodges, who successfully treated Rockford's eyes.

In the summer of 1959, Fuller guest-starred as young outlaw, Buck Harmon, in the episode "The Friend" on the ABC/Warner Brothers western series, Lawman. In the story line, Harmon is estranged from his minister father, played by Robert F. Simon. When the outlaw gang comes into Laramie, Buck switches sides to help his old friend, Deputy Johnny McKay (Peter Brown). In the shootout, Harmon is gunned down, but his father is spared. That same year Fuller also appeared as Davey Carey in another Lawman episode titled "The Souvenir."

In 1959, Patrick Kelly called Fuller to his office to offer him an opportunity to co-star opposite Academy Award-winner Ray Milland, in the CBS detective series, Markham. Fuller quickly turned down the role because he wanted to appear in westerns. He was David Dortort's second choice for the role of Lorne Greene's youngest cocky, impish son, Joseph "Little Joe" Cartwright, on NBC's Bonanza, but he lost the role to another young and then unknown actor--Michael Landon, whose career was made by that role. At about the same time, Fuller landed the co-starring role of Jess Harper on Laramie, which ran from 1959 to 1963, and Fuller was cast opposite another of his best friends, John Smith. Being the unknown, struggling actor that he was, Fuller was asked to do a screen test for the character of Slim Sherman, and John Smith had originally been cast as Jess Harper. Fuller insisted that he would be better cast as Harper, and after the screen test, he won the role of Jess, while Smith got the part of Slim.Laramie was eventually aired in more than 70 countries. When Laramie ended its run, Fuller jumped to another western, Wagon Train, alongside John McIntire (a veteran film actor, a two-time guest-star on Laramie, and a future star of The Virginian), Frank McGrath and Terry Wilson. According to an August 17, 2009 interview for On Screen and Beyond, Fuller noted that he was not brought into the show to replace Robert Horton (an actor Fuller met in 1954, when he and friend James Drury were under contract at MGM, and befriended for 62 years until Horton's death in March 2016) in the role of the wagon train scout. He resembled Horton and the two shared the same birthday, but Horton was nine years Fuller's senior. While Horton had worn a dark cowboy hat, Fuller usually wore a light one. Horton had already departed from the cast a season earlier, and McIntire had carried the series for a year. Fuller stepped in the following year, where he remained in the series (which switched to ABC in 1962) until it ended its run after two additional seasons.

Over the next six years, Fuller appeared in a handful of nondescript films. It seemed his career was stalling as the Western was slowly being retired from the American film industry. The one exception was his role as Vin in Return of the Seven (1966) which was a modest, if lackluster, sequel to The Magnificent Seven.In 1966, Fuller starred in the Western film Incident at Phantom Hill. That same year, he portrayed the ill-fated western military Captain William Judd Fetterman in the episode "Massacre at Fort Phil Kearney," near Fort Phil Kearny in Wyoming, one of NBC's Bob Hope Presents the Chrysler Theatre. His co-stars included Richard Egan, Phyllis Avery, Robert Pine, and Carroll O'Connor. He also appeared in the 1969 thriller What Ever Happened to Aunt Alice?, opposite Ruth Gordon and Geraldine Page, and co-starred with Joel McCrea in the 1976 western Mustang Country, McCrea's last movie. He also had a role in the 1979 TV action movie Disaster on the Coastliner, opposite Lloyd Bridges and Raymond Burr.

Emergency!

After producer Jack Webb saw Fuller in the 1971 movie The Hard Ride, he insisted Fuller star in his new NBC medical drama, Emergency!  Fuller was reluctant to play a doctor, especially in a series with a contemporary urban setting, but the persistent Webb convinced him to accept the role of Dr. Kelly Brackett, Chief of Emergency Medicine at the fictitious Rampart General Hospital. In the aforementioned 2009 interview with On Screen and Beyond, Fuller said that he had twice, politely, rejected the role of Brackett. Webb then reminded Fuller, much less politely, that Western shows had been repeatedly cancelled over the previous five years and that the genre was on the decline. In 1972, he also played the role of Dr. Kelly Brackett on Adam-12 (Episode: Lost and Found).

Fuller's and Julie London's co-stars on Emergency! were previously unknown actors Randolph Mantooth as John Roderick "Johnny" Gage and Kevin Tighe as Roy DeSoto, both playing paramedics. The other cast members got along very well with Fuller, his on-screen appearances were reduced because he had grown unhappy with the direction the show was taking, after feuding with one of the producers, off-camera, while at the same time, he was looking for Westerns.

In the 1980s and the 1990s
In 1980 Fuller starred in the pilot of a CBS Western series, Jake's Way, as the title character, along with younger newer actors Ben Lemon, Kristin Griffith and Stephen McNaughton; the series failed to sell. As the 1990s approached, he played supporting roles in more than 20 television shows, including The Love Boat, The Fall Guy (in two episodes which reunited him with Lee Majors, who met Fuller on The Big Valley), Murder, She Wrote (which reunited him with Eddie Albert, who guest-starred with Fuller on Laramie), Matt Houston, Tour of Duty, The Adventures of Brisco County Jr., JAG, and  Diagnosis: Murder, in an episode which reunited him with his former Emergency! co-star Randolph Mantooth (Malibu Fire). Toward the end of his acting career, he had a recurring role as Jess' supposed great-great-grandson Wade Harper on Walker, Texas Ranger with Chuck Norris and Clarence Gilyard. He also portrayed another character in the same series (in the second part of the episode "Last of a Breed") before being cast as Wade. His film appearances were fewer, consisting of a small role as a doctor in the comedy film Repossessed (1990) and a cameo as a poker player in Maverick (1994).

Personal life
Fuller is an accomplished singer. He did several "bandstand" gigs with Bill Aken's Los Nomadas rock group at holiday festivities in Whiskey Flats, California. While acting as grand marshal for the local Memorial Day parade, he performed a vocal rendition of the 1950s song "Caribbean," singing the same verse over and over. He later told the band that he only knew the first verse of the song. In 1967, he recorded an LP in Munich, Germany. Most of the songs were recorded in German, including  "Ein Einsamer Cowboy" ("Lonesome Cowboy"), "Adios Mexicana" ("Goodbye Mexican Girl"), "Uberall Auf Der Welt" ("All Over the World"), "Sind Wie Blumen" ("Girls Are Like Flowers"). Whether the album was successful in Germany is unknown.

Fuller was married for 22 years to Patricia Lee Lyon, whom he wed on December 20, 1962; they had three children:  Rob, Christine, and Patrick. The two divorced in 1984; Lyon died of cancer in 1994.

By the 1990s Fuller had largely retired from the film business. Since May 19, 2001, he has been married to actress Jennifer Savidge, known for her role on NBC's St. Elsewhere series. Through Savidge, Fuller also became very good friends with her acting coach, veteran producer and actor Norman Lloyd, who played Dr. Daniel Auschlander. 

Since March 18, 1990, Fuller, along with longtime friend James Drury, has been on the celebrity panel of the annual Festival of the West, a public/private party where die-hard fans can ask questions about his roles on Laramie, Wagon Train, and other Westerns. He also tells the story of his becoming a cowboy. Included at his party are country-Western dancing, lunch, and dinner.

From October 9 to October 11, 1998, Fuller was reunited with the rest of the surviving Emergency! cast, at the Emergency! Convention '98, which took place at the Burbank Airport Hilton in Burbank, California. All of the main actors attended except for Julie London, who had suffered a stroke in 1995. London's husband Bobby Troup attended just four months before his own death. Fuller and the rest of the cast and crew answered fans' questions and reminisced about their time together, during which the cast-mates said they got along well.

On March 10, 2010, Fuller presented James Drury with the "Cowboy Spirit Award" at the Festival of the West. He also paid tribute to John Smith, who died fifteen years earlier on January 25, 1995, of cirrhosis of the liver and heart problems. In the tribute he recounted many details about Smith's life, especially their on- and off-screen chemistry during their days on Laramie. Smith had also attended the Festival of the West for two seasons before his declining health rendered it impossible for him to appear.

On October 9, 2010, Fuller, James Drury and Don Reynolds participated in the Wild West Toy Show, sponsored by Bob Terry in Azle near Fort Worth, Texas. The event promotes horse riding and the purchase and exchange of Western merchandise.

In September 2012, Fuller, along with several other western celebrities, attended the first-ever Spirit of the Cowboy Western festival held at Chestnut Square in McKinney, Texas. The event is billed as the biggest and best Western festival in North Texas.

In the middle of 2004, Fuller and wife Jennifer Savidge moved from Los Angeles to North Texas to raise horses on a ranch. His neighbor and long-term friend Alex Cord had urged Fuller to move to Cooke County. The two, who are the same age, had met in 1961 on the set of Laramie'' when Cord made his television acting debut.

Fuller's stepfather, Robert Simpson Sr., died in 2009.

On July 29, 2013, Fuller celebrated his 80th birthday with his fans and his wife while vacationing on a ranch in Libby, Montana.

Awards

In 1961, Fuller won the Best Actor Award in Japan and the Japanese Golden Order of Merit, presented by the Empress of Japan. Fuller was the first American ever to earn this award.

In 1970, he won 5 Ottos, which are the German equivalent of the Emmy Awards. That same year, he won the Buffalo Bill award for Outstanding Western Entertainment.

On Apr. 16, 1974, Fuller won the Outstanding Service Award from the Huntsville Fire Department. This award was for bringing recognition to the firefighting profession and for his support for emergency assistance personnel throughout the nation.

For his contribution to the television industry, Robert Fuller has a star on the Hollywood Walk of Fame at 6608 Hollywood Blvd.

In 1989, he won the Golden Boot Award.

On Mar. 18, 2006, a bronze sculpture of Jess Harper on Traveller, was awarded to him by The Robert Fuller Fandom and The National Festival Of The West in recognition of his years of work in the entertainment industry.

On Oct. 12, 2007, he won the Silver Spur Award along with Stuart Whitman, Peter Brown, and Dean Smith, who received a lifetime achievement award.

On April 12, 2008, Fuller was inducted into the National Cowboy and Western Heritage Museum in Oklahoma City.

On Oct. 12, 2013, Fuller was the first recipient of the Spirit of the Cowboy Lonestar Legacy Award, a new award which recognized his status in the industry, as a true Western hero.

References

External links

1933 births
Living people
American male film actors
American male television actors
United States Army personnel of the Korean War
People from Key West, Florida
Actors from Troy, New York
Male Western (genre) film actors
Male actors from Los Angeles
Male actors from Florida
Male actors from New York (state)
Ranchers from Texas
People from Cooke County, Texas
Western (genre) television actors